Maurice Filion (February 12, 1932 – July 28, 2017) was a Canadian ice hockey coach and general manager. He served as general manager for the Quebec Nordiques throughout most of their time in the World Hockey Association (WHA), and briefly served as coach on three separate occasions. His tenure as general manager ended in 1988 when he was promoted to an executive role and was replaced by Martin Madden, but served as interim general manager for a few months in 1990 when Madden was fired.

Career
Filion spent two successful seasons at the helm of the Quebec Remparts of the QMJHL. During his rookie campaign, he won the Memorial Cup with a team led by numerous future NHL stars, including Guy Lafleur. His squad earned another Memorial Cup appearance the following season but lost in the finals.

Filion was hired by the Quebec Nordiques during their inaugural season in 1972-73. He was initially slated to serve as director of scouting but, after legendary former NHL star and initial Quebec head coach Maurice Richard resigned due to health problems, Fillion took over as head coach. The interim tag was removed after a successful 5-2 start to his WHA career. After the season, Filion moved to a role as the team's general manager.

Filion served as the team's GM until 1988, when he was replaced by Martin Madden; Filion then moved to the role of vice president of hockey operations, but he returned as GM in an interim capacity in 1990. He also served as head coach during the 1977-78 WHA season and 1980–81 NHL season. Six games into the 1980–81 season, with the Nordiques having won one game, lost three and tied two, Filion resigned as coach and gave the position to his newly hired assistant coach, Michel Bergeron.

Coaching record

Professional hockey

Junior hockey

References

External links

1932 births
2017 deaths
Canadian ice hockey coaches
French Quebecers
Ice hockey people from Montreal
Quebec Nordiques coaches
Quebec Nordiques executives
Quebec Remparts coaches